Ranova is a genus of longhorn beetles of the subfamily Lamiinae, containing the following species:

 Ranova lineigera Fairmaire, 1889
 Ranova pictipes Thomson, 1864
 Ranova similis Breuning, 1953

References

Crossotini